The following people are children of U.S. presidents, including stepchildren and alleged illegitimate children. All full names with married names are given   except for Theodore Roosevelt III and Herbert Charles Hoover. Currently there are 33 confirmed, known living presidential children, the oldest Lynda Bird Johnson Robb, the youngest Barron Trump. Two presidential children, John Quincy Adams and George W. Bush, have become president in their own right.

Presidential children have been studied individually and as a class. As individuals they are more often notable in their own right than most individuals: They disproportionately circulate among political and social leaders and the wealthier classes, and they are more likely to be scrutinized as part of celebrity culture. Additionally, as individuals they frequently have significant influence on other family members. For instance, a child may have had a significant influence on the child's parent: acting as a sounding board, or having behavioral issues that affected the parent's beliefs or performance. John Scott Harrison is the only person to be both a child of a U.S. president and a parent of another U.S. president, being a son of William Henry Harrison and the father of Benjamin Harrison.

As a class, the children of presidents have also occasioned significant study. Study has generally followed two paths: The issue of what access and inclusion within the circles of power does to individuals' lives, aspirations, and outcomes; and the issue of their influence on society and politics.

18th century

George Washington

with Martha Washington 
 No children together. Martha Washington had four children with Daniel Parke Custis. The three oldest (who died before her marriage to George Washington) are:
1. Unnamed daughter (1751)

2. Daniel Custis, Jr. (November 19, 1751 – February 19, 1754)

3. Frances Custis (April 12, 1753 – April 1, 1757) 

The last two children were Martha’s grandchildren by her son John, who came to live with their grandparents after the death of their father. John’s two oldest children, Elizabeth and Martha, remained with their mother.

alleged child with Venus (a slave)

John and Abigail Adams

19th century

Thomas Jefferson

with Martha Jefferson 

 Martha Jefferson also had one son with her first husband Bathurst Skelton, who died before her marriage to Jefferson:
1. John Skelton (November 7, 1767 – June 10, 1771)

with Sally Hemings 
 Children with Sally Hemings; see Jefferson DNA data

Thomas Woodson, the father of Lewis Woodson and Sarah Jane Woodson, was also claimed to be a child of Thomas Jefferson and Sally Hemings. However, DNA testing of the male Jefferson line and the male Woodson line showed no link.

James and Dolley Madison 
No children together, but raised the older of Dolley's 2 sons from her first marriage to John Todd:

James and Elizabeth Monroe

John Quincy and Louisa Adams

Andrew and Rachel Jackson 
 No biological children together, adopted two:

 Andrew and Rachel also served as guardians to eight children:

Martin and Hannah Van Buren

William Henry Harrison

with Anna Harrison

alleged children with Dilsia (a slave)

John Tyler

with Letitia Tyler

alleged child with a slave

with Julia Tyler

James and Sarah Polk 
The Polks remain the only presidential couple to never have children while together, biologically, adopted, or from previous marriage.

Zachary and Margaret Taylor

Millard and Abigail Fillmore 

Fillmore's second wife was Caroline Fillmore but they had no children.

Franklin and Jane Pierce

James Buchanan 
No biological children, and never married but had two nieces of whom he was the legal guardian

Abraham and Mary Lincoln

Andrew and Eliza Johnson

Ulysses and Julia Grant

Rutherford and Lucy Hayes

James and Lucretia Garfield

Chester and Ellen Arthur

Grover Cleveland and Maria Halpin 
See also section on Grover and Frances Cleveland

Benjamin Harrison

with Caroline Harrison

with Mary Harrison

Grover and Frances Cleveland
See also section on Grover Cleveland and Maria Halpin

William and Ida McKinley

20th century

Theodore Roosevelt

with Alice Roosevelt

with Edith Roosevelt

William and Helen Taft

Woodrow and Ellen Wilson 

 Wilson's second wife Edith Wilson, with her first husband Norman Galt, had one son, who died in infancy before her marriage to Wilson.

Warren G. Harding

with Florence Harding

with Nan Britton

Calvin and Grace Coolidge

Herbert and Lou Hoover

Franklin and Eleanor Roosevelt

Harry and Bess Truman

Dwight and Mamie Eisenhower

John and Jackie Kennedy

Lyndon and Lady Bird Johnson

Richard and Pat Nixon

Gerald and Betty Ford

Jimmy and Rosalynn Carter

Ronald Reagan

with Jane Wyman

with Nancy Reagan

George H. W. and Barbara Bush

Bill and Hillary Clinton

21st century

George W. and Laura Bush

Barack and Michelle Obama

Donald Trump

with Ivana Trump

with Marla Maples

with Melania Trump

Joe Biden

with Neilia Hunter Biden

with Jill Biden

Living presidential children 
In order of their ages, they are:

The most recent presidential child to die was Beau Biden, the eldest son of Joe Biden, who died on May 30, 2015, at the age of 46, before his father became president. The most recent presidential child to die who lived during their father's presidency was John Eisenhower, the only surviving son of Dwight D. Eisenhower, who died on December 21, 2013, at the age of 91. He was also the father-in-law of Julie Nixon Eisenhower, another presidential child.

See also
List of children of vice presidents of the United States

Notes

References 

Sources

 Bonnie Angelo, First Families: The Impact of the White House on Their Lives, 
 William A. Degregorio, The Complete Book of U.S. Presidents, Wings Books, 1991
 Doug Wead, All the President's Children: Triumph and Tragedy in the Lives of America's First Families, Atria Books, New York, 2003,

Further reading 
 Larry D. Underwood. All the President's Children, Dageford Publishing, 2002,  (a children's book)
 Quinn-Musgrove, Sandra L. and Kanter, Sanford, America's Royalty: All the President's Children, Olympic Marketing, 

 
Children of presidents
Presidents of the United States
Children by occupation of parent